Cumberland Township is the name of some places in the U.S. state of Pennsylvania:

Cumberland Township, Adams County, Pennsylvania
Cumberland Township, Greene County, Pennsylvania

See also
Cumberland Valley Township, Pennsylvania

Pennsylvania township disambiguation pages